Francis Odinaka Uzoho (born 28 October 1998) is a Nigerian professional footballer who plays as a goalkeeper for Cypriot First Division club Omonia and the Nigeria national team.

Club career
Born in Nwangele, Uzoho joined the Senegal branch of Aspire Academy in 2013, aged 14; initially a forward, he was converted into a goalkeeper after being deemed "too slow" at the age of 12. In 2016, after impressing on a tournament in Barcelona, he joined Deportivo de La Coruña's Juvenil squad.

Age rules meant that Uzoho could only become available to sign a contract with Dépor in January 2017; shortly after signing his contract, he started to train with the first team. Promoted to the reserve team ahead of the 2017–18 season, he made his senior debut on 10 September by starting in a 3–0 Segunda División B home win against Real Madrid Castilla.

Uzoho made his first team – and La Liga – debut on 15 October 2017, starting in a 0–0 away draw against SD Eibar. At the age of 18 years and 352 days, he became the youngest ever foreign goalkeeper to debut in La Liga, and the second-youngest player to appear in the league during the campaign at that point, only behind Real Madrid's Achraf Hakimi.

On 24 August 2018, Uzoho renewed his contract for three seasons and was immediately loaned to Segunda División side Elche CF for one year. In February 2019 he moved on loan to Cypriot club Anorthosis Famagusta, in the search for more first-team football in the run up to the 2019 Africa Cup of Nations.

After making his debut for the club, concerns were raised about his health certificate. As a result, Anorthosis Famagusta were deducted 9 points, which they appealed. The club's deduction appeal was rejected, although Uzoho's appeal against his personal penalty of a one-match ban and €1,000 fine was successful.

In July 2019 he returned on loan to Cyprus, this time with Omonia. He played a limited number of games, due to a serious injury he suffered while playing for his national team. In July 2020, Uzoho moved permanently to APOEL on a three year contract, but was released at the end of the season.

On 1 September 2021, Uzoho joined Omonia on a three-year deal, as back-up to Fabiano.

On 13 October 2022, Uzoho received praise for his performance against Manchester United at Old Trafford in the Europa League. Omonia lost 1–0 to a late goal, but Uzoho made 12 saves on the night. He was nominated for the Europa League Player of the Week and Save of the Day awards.

International career

Uzoho represented Nigeria under-17s at the 2013 FIFA U-17 World Cup. Aged only 14, he was an immediate backup to Dele Alampasu.

In October 2017 Uzoho received his first call-up to the Nigerian senior squad. He made his full international debut on 14 November, replacing Daniel Akpeyi in a 4–2 friendly win against Argentina.

He was named in Nigeria's 23-man squad for the 2018 FIFA World Cup in Russia. By that time he was considered Nigeria's first-choice goalkeeper.

He withdrew from the national squad in November 2018 due to injury. He was a squad member at the 2019 Africa Cup of Nations. Uzoho was in goal for Nigeria in the 3rd place match against Tunisia, which they won.

In October 2019 he suffered a ligament injury in a friendly match against Brazil, and underwent surgery in November 2019.

On 25 December 2021, He was shortlisted in 2021 AFCON Nations Cup by caretaker coach Eguavoen as part of the 28-Man Nigeria squad.

On 29 March 2022, Uzoho was in goal for Nigeria in a World Cup qualifier against Ghana. He suffered criticism for his performance, as an error on his behalf led to a goal for Ghana, and ultimately cost his team entry to the World Cup. He tendered an apology, mentioning "I wanted to take my nation to Qatar but rather did the opposite". National teammates and ex-internationals, such as Alex Iwobi and Vincent Enyeama, showed support for Uzoho.

Career statistics

Club

International

Honours
 Omonia
Cypriot Cup: 2021–22

References

External links

1998 births
Living people
Sportspeople from Imo State
Nigerian footballers
Association football goalkeepers
Nigeria international footballers
Nigeria youth international footballers
2018 FIFA World Cup players
2019 Africa Cup of Nations players
2021 Africa Cup of Nations players
Aspire Academy (Senegal) players
La Liga players
Segunda División B players
Deportivo Fabril players
Deportivo de La Coruña players
Elche CF players
Cypriot First Division players
Anorthosis Famagusta F.C. players
AC Omonia players
Nigerian expatriate footballers
Nigerian expatriate sportspeople in Qatar
Expatriate footballers in Qatar
Nigerian expatriate sportspeople in Spain
Expatriate footballers in Spain
Nigerian expatriates in Cyprus
Expatriate footballers in Cyprus
APOEL FC players